George V Coast is that portion of the coast of Antarctica lying between Point Alden, at 148°2′E, and Cape Hudson, at 153°45′E. 

Portions of this coast were sighted by the US Exploring Expedition in 1840.  It was explored by members of the Main Base party of the Australasian Antarctic Expedition (1911–14) under Douglas Mawson who named this feature for King George V of the United Kingdom.

The segment of land between these lines of longitude is referred to as George V Land. Mertz Glacier is located in this area.

Further reading 
 Cantero ÁLP, Marzal MF, Benthic hydroids (Cnidaria: Hydrozoa) from off George V Coast (East Antarctica), Zootaxa, 26 Jun 2018, 4441(1):121-136 DOI: 10.11646/zootaxa.4441.1.7 
 G. D. Williams, S. Aoki, S. S. Jacobs, S. R. Rintoul, T. Tamura, N. L. Bindoff, Antarctic Bottom Water from the Adélie and George V Land coast, East Antarctica (140–149°E) , JOURNAL OF GEOPHYSICAL RESEARCH, VOL. 115, C04027 https://doi.org/10.1029/2009JC005812
 Eugene Walter Domack ; John B. Anderson ; Dennis D. Kurtz, Clast shape as an indicator of transport and depositional mechanisms in glacial marine sediments; George V continental shelf, Antarctica, Journal of Sedimentary Research (1980) 50 (3): 813–819. https://doi.org/10.1306/212F7AF4-2B24-11D7-8648000102C1865D
 Frezzotti, M., Cimbelli, A., & Ferrigno, J. (1998), Ice-front change and iceberg behaviour along Oates and George V Coasts, Antarctica, 1912-96,  Annals of Glaciology, 27, 643–650. doi:10.3189/1998AoG27-1-643-650

External links 

 George V Coast on USGS website
 George V Coast on SCAR website
 George V Coast on visibleearth.nasa.gov
 George V Coast long term weather forecast

References 

Australian Antarctic Territory
Coasts of Antarctica